Football at the 1961 Maccabiah Games was held in several stadiums in Israel starting on 30 August.

The competition was open for men's teams only. Teams from 6 countries participated. For the first time since the establishment of Israel, the hosts didn't win the tournament, as Israel lost in the medals group to the team from United Kingdom, who went on to win the title.

As part of the closing ceremony, an exhibition match was played between Israel and Juventus F.C., which resulted with a 3–3 draw.

Format
The six teams were divided into two groups, each team playing the others once. The top two qualified for the medals group, while the bottom two played for the 6th-7th places.

Results

First round

Group A

1. The match between South Africa and Brazil was abandoned at the 80th minute, due to a brawl between the players.

Group B

1. The match between United Kingdom and Switzerland was postponed as the pitch at Rehovot wasn't fit for matches. As both teams already qualified for the semi-finals, the re-arranged match was played as a semi-final match.

Final round

5th-6th places group

Medals group

References

1961
Maccabiah Games